The Comptroller of Scotland was a post in the pre-Union government of Scotland.

The Treasurer and Comptroller had originated in 1425 when the Chamberlain's financial functions were transferred to them.

From 1466 the Comptroller had sole responsibility for financing the royal household to which certain revenues (the property) were appropriated, with the Treasurer being responsible for the remaining revenue (the casualty) and other expenditure.

By the 1530s the exchequer usually met in Edinburgh to audit and produce the accounts. Rooms were hired in the Blackfriars for the sessions. County sheriffs and other officials brought their reckonings to the exchequer. The accounts of the comptrollers were mostly in written in Latin, and were published as the Exchequer Rolls of Scotland.

James VI attended the Exchequer in person in Edinburgh on 13 February 1595, which pleased courtiers who wished to see him manage his estate. According to Roger Aston, he criticised inefficient exchequer officers who failed to maximise his revenues, forcing him to raise loans or tax his subjects.

The offices of Lord High Treasurer, Comptroller, Collector-General and Treasurer of the New Augmentation were held by the same person from 1610 onwards, but their separate titles survived the effective merging of their functions in 1635. From 1667 to 1682 the Treasury was in commission, and again from 1686 to 1708, when the separate Scottish Treasury was abolished. From 1690 the Crown nominated one person to sit in Parliament as Treasurer.

Comptrollers of Scotland

1426  David Brune
1429  John Spence
1446  Alexander Nairne of Sanford
1448  Robert de Livingston
1458  Ninian Spot canon of Dunkeld
1464  John Colquhoun of Colquhoun
1467  David Guthrie of Guthrie
1468  Adam Wallace of Craigie
1471  James Schaw of Sauquhy
1472  Alexander Leslie of Warderis
?     Thomas Simson
1488  Alexander Inglis, archdeacon of St Andrews
1492  Duncan Forestar of Skipinch.
1499  Patrick Hume of Polwarth
1506  James Beaton, abbot of Dunfermline
1507  James Riddoch of Aberladenoche
1513  Robert Arnot of Woodmill, killed at Flodden
1514  Duncan Forrester of Garden
1515  Patrick Hamilton
1516  Alexander Garden
1520  Robert Barton of Over Barnton
1525  Sir James Colville of Ochiltree
1538  David Wood of Craig
1543  Thomas Menzies
1546  William, commendator of Culross
1548  William, abbot of Ross
1557  Yves du Rubay, vice-chancellor to Mary of Guise as Regent
1560  Bartholomew de Villemore
1561  Sir John Wishart of Pitarrow
1565  Sir William Murray of Tullibardine
1567  James Cockburn of Skirling
1580 John Murray, younger of Tullibardine.
1584  Sir James Campbell of Ardkinglas
1585  Andrew Wood of Largo
1589  David Seton of Parbroath
1597  George Home of Wedderburn
1598  Walter Stewart, prior of Blantyre
1600  Sir David Murray of Gospertie, afterwards lord Scone
1603  Peter Rollock, bishop of Dunkeld
1610  Sir James Hay of Fingask
1615  Gideon Murray of Elibank, comptroller and treasurer-depute.

References

Political office-holders in Scotland
Monarchy and money
Scottish exchequer